K. Muralidharan Pillai  (born 30 October 1967), better known as Murali Pillai, is a Singaporean politician and lawyer. A member of the governing People's Action Party (PAP), he has been the Member of Parliament (MP) representing Bukit Batok SMC since 2016.

Pillai previously worked in the Singapore Police Force before he became a practising lawyer in 1996. He is currently a partner in Commercial Litigation practice at Rajah & Tann.

Pillai joined the People's Action Party (PAP) in 2001 and was the branch secretary to Ong Chit Chung, Member of Parliament for Bukit Batok. He was part of a five-member PAP team who contested and narrowly lost to the Workers' Party in Aljunied GRC during the 2015 general election. In 2016, Pillai was once again fielded in as a PAP candidate for the Bukit Batok by-election. He won 61.2% of the votes, securing his position as a Member of Parliament for Bukit Batok SMC. He is also an advisor of Bukit Batok SMC Grassroots Organisation.

Early life and education
Pillai's father, P. K. Pillai, was a trade unionist detained during Operation Coldstore in 1963. The elder Pillai died in 2007.

Pillai attended Newton Boys School, (now Monk's Hill Primary School), Monk's Hill Secondary School and Hwa Chong Junior College. before graduating from the National University of Singapore with a Bachelor of Laws with honours degree.

He subsequently went on to complete a Master of Laws degree and Master of Business Administration degree at the National University of Singapore. He also obtained a Master of Business Administration degree from the University of California, Los Angeles. 

Pillai played hockey as a student and had represented his school. He was also once President of Raffles Hall in NUS.

Police and legal career 
While serving his National Service, Pillai was a platoon commander in the 2nd Guards Battalion of the Singapore Army. In 1992, Pillai joined the Singapore Police Force as an Assistant Superintendent of Police, primarily involved in investigations into white-collar crimes. He completed his National Service obligations in 2017 as Deputy Superintendent (NS) upon reaching age of 50.

Pillai was called to the Singapore Bar in 1996. In 2014, he defended Choo Wee Khiang, a former PAP Member of Parliament, against his corruption charges.

Pillai was the head of commercial litigation at Rajah & Tann at the time of the 2016 Bukit Batok by-election. He then stepped down from his post in an effort to better balance his work commitments and political responsibilities. He was appointed Senior Counsel in 2020.

Political career 
A member of the PAP since 2001, Pillai served from 2007 to 2011 as the branch secretary at PAP's Bukit Batok branch. Then, Pillai served as the branch chairman of PAP's Paya Lebar branch from May 2012 to 2016.

2015 general election 
Pillai contested in the 2015 general election in a PAP team for the Aljuined GRC. Although the PAP team was ahead by around 300 votes in Pillai's ward of Paya Lebar within Aljunied GRC, the team gathered only 49.05% of the votes and lost to the team from the Workers' Party, which garnered 50.95% of the votes.

2016 Bukit Batok By-election 
On 12 March 2016, David Ong, the PAP Member of Parliament for Bukit Batok SMC, resigned, citing a "personal indiscretion". When the PAP announced on 21 March 2016 that Pillai would be their representative for the 2016 Bukit Batok by-election, Pillai was appointed branch chairman of PAP's Bukit Batok branch. Pillai was formally nominated as a candidate on 27 April 2016, the only other nominated candidate being Chee Soon Juan of the SDP.

During his campaign, Pillai chose the Mandarin nickname of "Ah-Mu". He pledged that if he won, he would upgrade infrastructure around Blocks 140 to 149 of the SMC, which would cost S$1.9 million. Pillai later clarified that this potential S$1.9 million project is "part of" the S$23.6 million masterplan announced by David Ong during the 2015 general election.

Pillai's campaign manifesto focused on three domains: jobs, social mobility and the elderly.

Pillai defeated the Singapore Democratic Party's candidate Chee Soon Juan and secured 61.21% of the votes to win the Bukit Batok by-election on Polling Day. He was sworn into parliament on 9 May 2016.

After the 2018 cabinet reshuffle, Pillai was appointed Chairperson of Home Affairs and Law Government Parliamentary Committee (GPC) in the 14th Parliament.

2020 general election 
On 30 June 2020, after submitting his nomination papers for the election, Pillai claimed on social media that there was an online attack against his son, who was convicted of an offence. It was alleged that it was a deliberate attack on his candidacy. Chee, his election opponent from SDP, criticised the attack.

During the campaign period, Pillai was criticised by Chee Soon Juan from the Singapore Democratic Party for the fulfilment, delays, and safety issues in his constituency projects. Pillai was also publicly criticised by one of his constituents on Facebook for being unempathetic to her housing issues, suggesting to her that marriage was the solution to her issues. Pillai still won the election with 54.80% of the valid votes.

During the COVID-19 pandemic, Pillai was criticised by Chee for allowing a gathering of seniors to take place. Pillai attended the event in his position as the adviser to Bukit Batok's Grassroots Organisations. Pillai defended against the criticism by saying that precautions were in place for the dinner.

Personal life 

Pillai married his educator wife, N. Gowri, in 1996. The couple have twin sons, Dipan and Dinesa, and two daughters, Dheeptaa and Dhivyaa.

References

External links 
 Lawyer Profile - K. Muralidharan Pillai
 Murali Pillai on Parliament of Singapore

People's Action Party politicians
Hwa Chong Junior College alumni
University of California, Los Angeles alumni
National University of Singapore alumni
Living people
1967 births
20th-century Singaporean lawyers
Singaporean police officers
Members of the Parliament of Singapore
21st-century Singaporean lawyers